Events in the year 1984 in Mexico.

Incumbents

Federal government 
 President: Miguel de la Madrid
 Interior Secretary (SEGOB): Manuel Bartlett Díaz
 Secretary of Foreign Affairs (SRE): Bernardo Sepúlveda Amor
 Communications Secretary (SCT): Rodolfo Félix Valdés/Daniel Díaz Díaz
 Education Secretary (SEP): Manuel Bartlett
 Secretary of Defense (SEDENA): Juan Arévalo Gardoqui
 Secretary of Navy: Miguel Ángel Gómez Ortega
 Secretary of Labor and Social Welfare: Arsenio Farell Cubillas
 Secretary of Welfare: Guillermo Carrillo Arena
 Secretary of Public Education: Jesús Reyes Heroles
 Tourism Secretary (SECTUR): Carlos Hank González 
 Secretary of the Environment (SEMARNAT): Pedro Ojeda Paullada
 Secretary of Health (SALUD): Guillermo Soberón Acevedo

Supreme Court

 President of the Supreme Court: Jorge Iñárritu y Ramírez de Aguilar

Governors 

 Aguascalientes: Rodolfo Landeros Gallegos
 Baja California: Xicoténcatl Leyva Mortera (PRI)
 Baja California Sur: Alberto Andrés Alvarado Arámburo
 Campeche: Eugenio Echeverría Castellot
 Chiapas: Absalón Castellanos Domínguez
 Chihuahua: Oscar Ornelas
 Coahuila: José de las Fuentes Rodríguez
 Colima: Griselda Álvarez
 Durango: Armando del Castillo Franco
 Guanajuato: Enrique Velasco Ibarra/Agustin Téllez Cruces
 Guerrero: Alejandro Cervantes Delgado
 Hidalgo: Guillermo Rossell de la Lama
 Jalisco: Enrique Álvarez del Castillo
 State of Mexico: Alfredo del Mazo González
 Michoacán: Cuauhtémoc Cárdenas
 Morelos: Lauro Ortega Martínez
 Nayarit: Emilio Manuel González Parra
 Nuevo León: Alfonso Martínez Domínguez/Jorge Treviño
 Oaxaca: Pedro Vázquez Colmenares
 Puebla: Guillermo Jiménez Morales
 Querétaro: Rafael Camacho Guzmán
 Quintana Roo: Pedro Joaquín Coldwell
 San Luis Potosí: Carlos Jonguitud Barrios
 Sinaloa: Antonio Toledo Corro
 Sonora: Samuel Ocaña García
 Tabasco: Enrique González Pedrero
 Tamaulipas: Emilio Martínez Manautou	
 Tlaxcala: Tulio Hernández Gómez
 Veracruz: Agustín Acosta Lagunes
 Yucatán: Graciliano Alpuche Pinzón/Víctor Cervera Pacheco
 Zacatecas: José Guadalupe Cervantes Corona
Regent of Mexico City: Ramón Aguirre Velázquez

Events

 The original Law on the National Coat of Arms, Flag and Anthem is passed. 
 The Universidad Azteca is founded.
 March 14: Roman Catholic Diocese of Coatzacoalcos established.
 September 17 – 23: Hurricane Odile
 November 3:  Roman Catholic Diocese of Atlacomulco established
 November 19: San Juanico disaster

Awards
Belisario Domínguez Medal of Honor – Salomón González Blanco

Births
May 17 — Alejandro Edda, actor
July 5 — Carlos Ferro, actor and music video director

Deaths
January 7 — Eva Sámano de Lopez, First Lady of Mexico (1958-1964) (b. 1910)

Film

 List of Mexican films of 1984

Sport

 1983–84 Mexican Primera División season. 
 Leones de Yucatán win the Mexican League. 
 Mexico at the 1984 Winter Olympics.
 Mexico at the 1984 Summer Olympics.
 Mexico at the 1984 Summer Paralympics. 
 The Indios de Ciudad Juárez cease to exist. 
 The Pioneros de Cancún are founded. 
 The Ángeles de Puebla are founded.

References

External links

 
Mexico